Yo Ho may refer to:

 Yo Ho (A Pirate's Life for Me), the theme song of the Pirates of the Caribbean attractions at Disney theme parks
 USS Yo Ho (SP-463), a patrol vessel that served in the United States Navy from 1917 to 1919.

See also
Yoho (disambiguation)